Pedhmala is a village situated in Himmatnagar taluka, Sabarkantha district, Gujarat, India.

Khed, Manorpur, Berna, Chandarni, Gambhoi, Hunj are the villages along with this village in the same Himatnagar Taluk

Nearby villages are Bodi (3.1 km), Adpodra (3.3 km), Rupal (4.1 km), Adapur (4.3 km), Sadha (5 km). Nearby towns are Modasa (16.7 km), Himatnagar (20.5 km), Dhansura (21.3 km), Talod (27.6 km).

Pedhmala Pin Code is 383030.

See also
Bamna

References

Villages in Sabarkantha district